Khalil Mamut is a Uyghur refugee, imprisoned for seven years at the United States Guantanamo Bay detention camps, in Cuba.

The US Department of Defense estimated that Mamut was born in Kashgar, Xinjiang, China, in 1977 and assigned him the Guantanamo Internment Serial Number 278.

Mamut is one of the 22 Uighurs held in Guantanamo for many years despite it becoming clear early on that they were innocent.

He won his habeas corpus in 2008. Judge Ricardo Urbina declared his detention as unlawful and ordered to set him free in the United States. He was sent to Bermuda in June 2009.

Sent to Bermuda

Abdul Helil Mamut,
and three other Uyghurs
Huzaifa Parhat, Emam Abdulahat and Jalal Jalaladin
were set free in Bermuda on June 11, 2009.

References

External links
From Guantánamo to the United States: The Story of the Wrongly Imprisoned Uighurs Andy Worthington October 9, 2008
Judge Ricardo Urbina's unclassified opinion (redacted version)
MOTIONS/STATUS HEARING - UIGHURS CASES BEFORE THE HONORABLE RICARDO M. URBINA
Human Rights First; Habeas Works: Federal Courts' Proven Capacity to Handle Guantánamo Cases (2010)

Guantanamo detainees known to have been released
People from Kashgar
Uyghurs
Living people
1977 births